The Égratz Viaduct is a curved concrete box girder bridge in south-east France, in the French Alps, near Switzerland and Italy. The bridge is almost one mile long.

History

Design
It is a curved box girder bridge.

Construction
It opened on 22 December 1981.

Structure
It is in the Haute-Savoie department. It carries road traffic on the N205, the eastern continuation of the A40 autoroute.

The viaduct featured in aerial photography in the 2016 film Our Kind of Traitor.

References

External links
 Structurae

1981 establishments in France
Box girder bridges in France
Bridges completed in 1981
Buildings and structures in Haute-Savoie
Concrete bridges in France